Ika-6 na Utos was a Philippine television drama broadcast by GMA Network. It premiered on GMA Afternoon Prime block and worldwide on GMA Pinoy TV from December 5, 2016 to March 17, 2018, replacing Oh, My Mama!. Since April 1, 2017, the program expanded to Saturdays due to its immense popularity and high viewership, replacing Case Solved.

NUTAM (Nationwide Urban Television Audience Measurement) People in Television Homes ratings are provided by AGB Nielsen Philippines. 
The series ended, but its the 63rd-week run, and with 383 episodes. It was replaced by  Contessa.

Series overview

Episodes

December 2016

January 2017

February 2017

March 2017

April 2017

May 2017

June 2017

July 2017

August 2017

September 2017

October 2017

November 2017

December 2017

January 2018

February 2018

March 2018

References

Lists of Philippine drama television series episodes